Barb Wire is a 1922 American silent Western film directed by Francis J. Grandon and starring Jack Hoxie, Jean Porter and Joseph McDermott.

Plot
Jack Harding (Jack Hoxie) is a landowner who defies a gang headed by Bart Moseby (William Berke).  Jack fences in his land claim with barbed wire, which angers Bart and his gang. Jack hides in his sweetheart's room to overhear Bart's plans to get him.  Bart commits a crime and leaves Jack's hat and gun as evidence.  At the trial, Jack's mother distracts the court while Jack leaps from the window to his horse.  A fight between Jack and Bart follows as Jack brings Bart to justice.

Cast
 Jack Hoxie as Jack Harding
 Jean Porter as Joan Lorne
 Olah Norman as Martha Harding
 William Berke as Bart Moseby 
 Joseph McDermott as Nick Lazarre 
 Jim Welch as Bob Lorne

References

External links
 

1922 films
1922 Western (genre) films
American black-and-white films
Films directed by Francis J. Grandon
Silent American Western (genre) films
1920s English-language films
1920s American films